Jagpreet Singh (born 1988) is an Indian football player. He is currently playing for Minerva Punjab in the I-League as a midfielder.

Career

JCT
Jagpreet has been playing for JCT FC since past 5 years. He played key role in JCT FC's battle to avoid relegation and was eventually called up to Indian probables.

Churchill Brothers
Jagpreet in an interview revealed that he has signed a two-year deal with another I-League club Churchill Brothers.

East Bengal
On 13 August 2012 it was confirmed that Singh had joined East Bengal F.C. of the I-League.

Mohammedan Sporting
Jagpreet signed for Mohammedan Sporting for 1-year deal contract.

Honours

India U23
SAFF Championship: 2009

References

External links

Indian footballers
1988 births
Living people
Footballers from Punjab, India
Churchill Brothers FC Goa players
India international footballers
India youth international footballers
Mohammedan SC (Kolkata) players
I-League players
Association football midfielders